Tangata Mouauri Vavia (born 8 September 1949) is a Cook Islands politician and former Cabinet Minister.  He is a member of the Cook Islands Democratic Party.

Vavia was born in Mitiaro in the Cook Islands. He was educated in Mitiaro then at Avarua, Nikao, Nikao Side School and Tereora College.  He worked as a postal clerk, then as a police constable before being elected to Parliament as member for Mitiaro in the 1994 elections.

Vavia was elected Deputy Speaker in 1999.  He subsequently served in the Cabinet of Sir Terepai Maoate as Minister of Justice and Outer Islands.  He lost his position when Robert Woonton replaced Maoate, but was reappointed briefly in 2003 when Woonton's coalition with the Cook Islands Party fell apart. A further coalition realignment in November of that year saw him resign his portfolios and join the opposition.

In 2005, following the demise of Jim Marurai's "partnership government", he rejoined Cabinet as Minister for Outer Islands Administration.  He was re-elected in the 2006 election, and appointed Minister for Infrastructure and Planning, Cook Islands Investment Corporation, and Transport.

Vavia resigned his portfolios in December 2009 in protest at the sacking from Cabinet of Democratic Party leader Terepai Maoate.   He was re-elected at the 2010 election. At the 2014 general election, he received exactly the same number of votes as his Cook Islands Party opponent in his Mitiaro constituency. A by-election was held in November, then retroactively cancelled by court order before the ballots could be counted. In December, Vavia was awarded the seat by the court following a recount of the July results. He subsequently lost the seat at the 2018 election.

References

Living people
Cook Island Māori people
Members of the Parliament of the Cook Islands
1949 births
People from Mitiaro
Democratic Party (Cook Islands) politicians
Infrastructure ministers of the Cook Islands
Justice ministers of the Cook Islands
Planning ministers of the Cook Islands
Transport ministers of the Cook Islands
Cook Island police officers